Nahuel Alberto Omiliani González (born 1 April 1996) is a Spanish footballer who plays for SD Ejea as a left back.

Club career
Nahuel was born in Santa Cruz de Tenerife, Canary Islands to an Argentine father, and was a CD Tenerife youth graduate. He made his debut as a senior with the reserves on 3 January 2015, starting in a 1–0 Tercera División away win against UD Villa de Santa Brígida.

On 10 June 2017 Nahuel made his first team debut, coming on as a second-half substitute for Raúl Cámara in a 2–1 away win against Real Zaragoza in the Segunda División. On 30 August of the following year, he was loaned to Segunda División B side Real Murcia for one year.

References

External links

1996 births
Living people
Footballers from Santa Cruz de Tenerife
Spanish people of Argentine descent
Spanish footballers
Association football defenders
Segunda División players
Segunda División B players
Tercera División players
CD Tenerife B players
CD Tenerife players
Real Murcia players
SD Ejea players